Tokamak can refer to:

 Tokamak, a fusion reactor device
 Tokamak de Fontenay aux Roses, the first French tokamak
 Tokamak (software), an open-source physics engine
 Tokamak, a fictional supervillain for DC Comics

See also 
 Tokmak (disambiguation)